The Arabic top-level domain  (meaning ".web", and transcribed into English as ".shabaka") is an internationalized domain name top-level domain in the Domain Name System of the Internet for Arabic language websites. Websites using the domain can be accessed using its U-label or A-label equivalent.

The domain was approved for use by ICANN (the Internet Corporation for Assigned Names and Numbers) in March 2013. Its sunrise period ran from 31 October to 29 December 2013, and landrush period from 2 January to 31 January 2014. General availability for the domain commenced on 4 February 2014.

See also
 Internationalized country code top-level domain

Notes

References

Citations

External links
 dotShabaka Registry - registrar for  domains

Internationalized domain names
Top-level domains